Francisco Cepeda (8 March 1906 – 14 July 1935) was a Spanish cyclist. He died while being transported to a hospital after a fall in the Tour de France on the descent of the Col du Galibier.

Major results

1925
1st Circuito de Getxo
1926
2nd Prueba Villafranca de Ordizia
2nd Circuito de Getxo
1927
3rd Spanish National Road Race Championships
1929
1st Circuito de Getxo
1st GP Pascuas
1st Vuelta a Alava
2nd GP Vizcaya
1931
2nd Prueba Villafranca de Ordizia
3rd GP Vizcaya
1932
3rd Vuelta a Alava

References

1906 births
1935 deaths
Cyclists who died while racing
People from Enkarterri
Spanish male cyclists
Sport deaths in France
Sportspeople from Biscay
Cyclists from the Basque Country (autonomous community)